Darwin Football Stadium is a sports stadium in Darwin, Australia in the Marrara Sporting Complex, and is located adjacent to the TIO Stadium.

Work began on the stadium  in 2007 and was officially opened on 28 July 2007 when it played host to an A-League Pre-Season Cup game between Perth Glory and Melbourne Victory.

The stadium has a seating capacity for up to 1,120 spectators, but can hold up to 6,000 including standing space.

It has hosted home ties for Darwin-based clubs in the Australia Cup.

References

External links
Darwin Football Stadium - at Austadiums

2007 establishments in Australia
Sports venues completed in 2007
Soccer venues in the Northern Territory
Buildings and structures in Darwin, Northern Territory
Tourist attractions in Darwin, Northern Territory
Sports venues in Darwin, Northern Territory
Soccer in the Northern Territory